CKLY-FM is a Canadian radio station, broadcasting at 91.9 FM in Lindsay, Ontario. The station broadcasts an adult hits format branded as Bounce 91.9.

History
The station was launched on December 8, 1955 on 910 AM, owned by Greg-May Broadcasting and licensed to the community of Lindsay. It was acquired by McNabb Broadcasting in 1981, and by Centario Communications in 1993.

On January 7, 1998, Centario received permission from the CRTC to convert CKLY to the FM band at 91.9 MHz with an effective radiated power of 14,000 watts. CKLY-FM began on-air testing in early April 1998 with low power from a tower at the studio location. Full-power tests began a short time later from a new tower located at the AM transmitter site. The station officially signed on at 91.9 FM in May branded as Y92 retaining the "CKLY" call letters. According to the Canadian Communications Foundation, the CKLY 910 AM transmitter was shut down on May 24, 1998.

The station was acquired by CHUM Limited on December 21, 2000, and by CTVglobemedia, now Bell Media on March 23, 2007.

On May 19, 2005, CKLY was given approval to decrease average effective radiated power from 14,000 to 5,270 watts (maximum ERP from 27,500 to 11,400 watts), to increase antenna height (from 45 to 131 metres EHAAT) and to relocate the transmitter.

On August 22, 2005, CKLY adopted the Bob FM branding and adult hits format.

On July 8, 2008, long-time CKLY owner Pete McNabb died at the Victoria Manor in Lindsay. McNabb owned CKLY for 25 years, from 1961 to 1986.

In 2011, the station was acquired by Bell Media.

As part of a mass format reorganization, it was rebranded as Bounce 91.9 on May 18, 2021.

Former logo

References

External links
 Bounce 91.9 
 
 

Kly
Kly
CKLY
Kly
Kly
Kawartha Lakes
1955 establishments in Ontario